Interferon-induced protein with tetratricopeptide repeats 1 is a protein that in humans is encoded by the IFIT1 gene.

References

Further reading